Jean-Paul Gros (born 10 December 1960 in Saint-Symphorien-d'Ozon) is a French former sport shooter who competed in the 1992 Summer Olympics, in the 1996 Summer Olympics, and in the 2000 Summer Olympics.

References

1960 births
Living people
French male sport shooters
Trap and double trap shooters
Olympic shooters of France
Shooters at the 1992 Summer Olympics
Shooters at the 1996 Summer Olympics
Shooters at the 2000 Summer Olympics
Sportspeople from Rhône (department)
20th-century French people